United and Alternative Left (EUiA) is a political party in Catalonia, Spain. EUiA has 4000 members, and it is the Catalan correspondent of the Spain-wide United Left (IU).

It was formed in 1998 as a schism from Iniciativa per Catalunya (IpC). It comprises an alliance of Party of the Communists of Catalonia, Living Unified Socialist Party of Catalonia, POR, PRT-IR, PASOC, CEA, and CLI. After competing in a series of elections with their former colleagues at Iniciativa, the two parties agreed to run together as an electoral coalition. Currently, 2 out of the 12 MPs at the regional Parliament of Catalonia ascribed to the IpC-EUiA group are members of this latter party.

Electoral performance

Parliament of Catalonia

 * Within Initiative for Catalonia Greens–United and Alternative Left.
 ** Within Catalunya Sí que es Pot.
 *** Within Catalunya en Comú–Podem.

Cortes Generales

Catalonia

 * Within Initiative for Catalonia Greens–United and Alternative Left.
 ** Within En Comú Podem.
 *** Within Catalan Agreement of Progress.

European Parliament

 * Within United Left.
 ** Within The Left.
 *** Within Plural Left.
 **** Within Initiative for Catalonia Greens–United and Alternative Left.

See also
List of political parties in Catalonia

References

External links
Esquerra Unida i Alternativa website 

 
Communist parties in Spain
Federations of United Left (Spain)
Party of the European Left member parties
Political parties established in 1998
Political parties in Catalonia
United Left (Spain)